The Daily Ummat is a far-right wing and Islamist Urdu-language newspaper published in Karachi, Sindh, Pakistan. The newspaper was founded in 1996 by Abdul Rafiq Afghan and family.

References

External links

Daily newspapers published in Pakistan
Mass media in Karachi
Conservatism in Pakistan
Urdu-language newspapers published in Pakistan
Islamism in Pakistan
Jihadism
Kashmir conflict